The Shadow Minister for the Cabinet Office is a position in the British Shadow Cabinet, appointed by the Leader of the Opposition. The post involves holding the Cabinet Office and the Minister for the Cabinet Office to account.

The position is currently held by Angela Rayner, Labour MP for Ashton-under-Lyne. She was appointed to the role in May 2021 by Keir Starmer, succeeding Rachel Reeves. Rayner shadows Conservative MP Stephen Barclay .

Shadow Ministers for the Cabinet Office

See also
 Official Opposition frontbench
 Shadow Cabinet of Keir Starmer
 Shadow First Secretary of State
 Shadow Chancellor of the Duchy of Lancaster
 Shadow Minister of State at the Cabinet Office

References

Official Opposition (United Kingdom)
Cabinet Office (United Kingdom)